The Chenagai airstrike took place on October 30, 2006, around 5:00 am local time. Missiles were fired at a madrassa in Chenagai village in Bajaur region of Pakistan. An eyewitness has stated that the madrassa was filled with local students who had resumed studies after the Eid ul-Fitr holiday. 82 people died in the attack. The United States was accused of the attacks. The U.S. government denied involvement in the attack. Long War Journal blamed U.S. for the air strike as only U.S. was able to conduct precision night strikes in the region. The role of United States in the airstrike was confirmed later on.

Background
In January 2006, US forces in Afghanistan carried out an airstrike in Bajaur's Damadola village which US officials tried to cover up by saying it was aimed at al-Qaeda's second-in-command, Ayman al-Zawahiri. However, Al-Zawahiri never went to Bajaur.

The airstrike
The attack took place in Chenagai village near the town of Khar, the main town in Bajaur region. The leader of the madrassa, cleric Maulana Liaqat Ullah Hussain, was suspected to be sheltering al-Qaeda militants and was among the dead. Locals said the missiles were fired by the US drones.

U.S. involvement
According to the American Broadcasting Company, the attack was launched by a MQ-1 Predator with Ayman al-Zawahiri as its intended target. However, the report's author has since been removed from ABC's site due to questions concerning the reliability of his reporting.

Pakistani officials have said that the strike was conducted by the U.S. and that they have also requested the U.S. not to violate their sovereignty again. Local people said the victims included boys as young as 12. Long War Journal, after conducting analysis of the strike, said the strike was indeed carried out by U.S. as Pakistan does not possess capabilities to conduct precision night strikes. The role of United States in the airstrike was confirmed later on.

Reaction
There were angry reactions in response to the strike. Many Muslim groups have condemned the action. Siraj-ul-Haq, the senior Minister and Provincial Chief of the Jamaat-e-Islami party, resigned from the provincial cabinet in protest against the strikes. Sahibzada Haroonur Rashid, MNA (Member of National Assembly) from Bajaur Agency, also resigned from the National Assembly in protest.

Retaliation
Following attacks against the madrasa in the Bajaur tribal agency, on November 8, 2006, a suicide bomber killed 42 Pakistani soldiers and injured 20 others in Dargai, 85 miles north-west of Islamabad. It has already called the deadliest attack by the militants on the army since it began operations against pro-Taliban and al-Qaeda forces. Though no one has claimed responsibility as yet, the attack has been linked to the Bajaur militants.

See also
 Damadola airstrike of Jan 13, 2006
 Drone attacks in Pakistan
 List of drone strikes in Pakistan
 Gora Prai airstrike

References

Conflicts in 2006
Airstrikes of the insurgency in Khyber Pakhtunkhwa
Chenegai
October 2006 events in Pakistan
2006 in Pakistan
Pakistan–United States military relations